Angela Cappetta is an American photographer.

Early life
Cappetta has Italian heritage and had a multi-generational upbringing in New Haven, Connecticut.

Photography 
In the 1990s, she often got up early in the morning to walk the neighborhood of her home in the Alphabet City area of Manhattan and photograph with a 6x9 format camera.  Her work includes diaristic self-portraits.

Cappetta's photographic series "Glendalis" revolves around a Puerto Rican girl named Glendalis, whose family shared multiple floors of a building on Stanton Street. The series follows Glendalis and her family for a decade, beginning in the 1990s when Glendalis was nine years old; it documents milestone events such as Glendalis's Sweet 16 and her cousin's quinceañera. Cappetta has acknowledged parallels between Glendalis's life and her own childhood. In 1999, some of her images were included in the group show Common Boundary at the Center for Photography at Woodstock ("CPW") curated by Sandra S. Phillips. In December 2022, The New Yorker published an article about Cappetta and this project, stating that the series was not designed to follow Glendalis from the outset, but that she became the nucleus of the photo series as time went on. Cappetta says the works are not a coming of age. She views them instead as a representation of family, community, and how relationships evolve over time. 

Cappetta received a fellowship from the New York Foundation for the Arts in 2000, and completed fellowships at the MacDowell Colony in 2000, 2004 and 2010. Prints from her Glendalis series are held in the collection of CPW and in the collection of the New York Public Library (as of August 2018).

References

External links

Interview on Lenscratch
Interview at aPhotoEditor
Interview on Edge of Humanity
Interview on Gwarlingo
The Hair Exhibition Lenscratch
Catalog at New York Public Library 
The Family That is not Mine Blind Magazine
Coming of Age on the Lower East Side i-D
Watching a Girl’s Life Change on the Lower East Side [www.newyorker.com/culture/photo-booth/watching-a-girls-life-change-on-the-lower-east-side// The New Yorker]

American women photographers
21st-century American photographers
Living people
Place of birth missing (living people)
Year of birth missing (living people)
21st-century American women